is a Japanese manga artist. He created the manga Shadow Star and Bokurano: Ours, both of which were adapted into anime series.

Biography
Kitoh's first manga Vendémiaire no Tsubasa debuted in Afternoon magazine in 1995. It consists of several short stories where mechanical puppet humanoids called Vendemaires meet and serve boys of various character and morals. Vendémiaire no Tsubasa ran until 1997 and was published by Kodansha in 2 volumes. It was followed in 1999 by SiNNa 1905, a single-volume online manga detailing a civil war in an alternate-history Japan. Kitoh's next major manga series was a science-fiction drama called Shadow Star, also known in Japan as Narutaru, about elementary and middle-schoolers who adopt alien starfish-like creatures. It ran in Afternoon from 1998 to 2003, and was adapted into an anime series in 2003.
Kitoh released his manga series Bokurano: Ours, about a group of children who participate in a real-life robot battle against alien invaders but whose victories cost their lives. It was serialized in Ikki magazine from 2003 to 2009 and published in 11 volumes. A one-shot spinoff, Bokurano Tokubetsu-hen was announced but not published in Ikki magazine, but rather bundled with the 11th tankōbon volume. It was adapted into an anime series, however the director Hiroyuki Morita made changes to the anime story with Kitoh's permission. In 2010, Bokurano won an Excellence Prize in the Manga Division at the 14th Japan Media Arts Festival Awards. In 2011, he designed the Septentrion invader characters in the video game Devil Survivor 2, which was also made into an anime. Around the same time, Kitoh also served as a character designer for the animated film Evangelion: 2.0 You Can (Not) Advance, in which he was responsible for the design of the Third Angel. From 2009 to 2015, Kitoh worked on the manga Noririn, serialized in Kodansha's Evening magazine, about a salaryman who loses his driver's license and takes up cycling along with a road racing high school girl. It ran for 11 volumes. In 2015, Kitoh released Futago no Teikoku, a fantasy manga which takes place in a world resembling Japanese-occupied China during the 1930s and concerns a girl cursed to kill anyone who touches her. So far three volumes have been written. His most recent manga, Hayabusa-chan mo Tondemasu was released in January 2017.

Works

Anime

Video games

References

External links
  
  
 Japanese language interview with Mohiro Kitoh

Manga artists
1966 births
Living people
People from Nagoya